(Louis) Michael Macaque (born 15 August 1974) is a former Mauritian super heavyweight boxer, who competed at the 2000 Summer Olympics in Sydney, and served as the nation's flag bearer at the opening ceremony. He was also the runner-up in super heavyweight boxing at the 1998 Commonwealth Games in Kuala Lumpur, Malaysia, after being defeated by England's Audley Harrison.

At the 2000 Summer Olympics, Macaque qualified for the super heavyweight division in boxing after winning silver at the 1999 All-Africa Games in Johannesburg, South Africa. Unfortunately, he was eliminated in the first round after being defeated by Canada's Art Binkowski with a score of 14–21. A year later, Macaque fulfilled his success of winning the gold medal at the 2001 African Amateur Boxing Championships in his home nation Mauritius. His boxing career ended after winning silver at the 2003 African Amateur Boxing Championships in Yaoundé, Cameroon, losing out to Carlos Takam.

See also
List of flag bearers for Mauritius at the Olympics

References

External links
 

1974 births
Living people
People from Port Louis District
Super-heavyweight boxers
Boxers at the 1998 Commonwealth Games
Boxers at the 2002 Commonwealth Games
Commonwealth Games silver medallists for Mauritius
Boxers at the 2000 Summer Olympics
Olympic boxers of Mauritius
Mauritian male boxers
Commonwealth Games medallists in boxing
African Games silver medalists for Mauritius
African Games medalists in boxing
Competitors at the 1999 All-Africa Games
Medallists at the 1998 Commonwealth Games